Bonnard John Teegarden (born August 23, 1940) is an American astrophysicist formerly with NASA's Goddard Space Flight Center, now retired. He spent most of his career studying cosmic gamma rays and is best known to the public for leading the team that discovered Teegarden's star in 2003.

Education
Teegarden grew up in Fair Haven, New Jersey and graduated from Rumson-Fair Haven Regional High School in Rumson in 1958. He earned a Bachelor of Science from the Massachusetts Institute of Technology in 1962 and a Doctor of Philosophy from the University of Maryland in 1967. His thesis was "A Study of Low Energy Galactic Cosmic Rays" and his advisor was Frank B. McDonald.

Career

The discovery of Teegarden's star

The discovery of Teegarden's star came as somewhat of a surprise as no close-by stars had been discovered for many decades. Teegarden's team found this star in data taken years earlier by an unrelated program searching for near-Earth asteroids.
The real excitement was from the initial measurements the team made for the parallax of this star. These initial measurements indicated that the star may be very close at a distance of about seven light-years. This would have made it the third-closest star system. This excitement resulted in numerous popular press articles and public interest. In the years since the discovery was announced the measured distances gradually increased. The accepted distance is now more than twelve light-years and public interest has faded somewhat, but not before Teegarden was rewarded with the name of this newly discovered star, although other designations are sometimes used as well.

Other work
Teegarden was a cosmic ray researcher at NASA's Goddard Space Flight Center for all of his professional life. He was co-investigator on the Pioneer Jupiter cosmic ray experiments and later an investigator on the space based INTEGRAL and BATSE experiments. He was also involved in studies of stellar nucleosynthesis. He is a prolific researcher with 200 articles listed in SAO/NASA Astrophysics Data System.

Personal life
After retiring from NASA Teegarden and his wife moved to Annapolis, Maryland. He now works wood, and sails. He has developed special software for making decorative wooden bowls.

See also
 Stars named after people

References

External links
 Teegarden Turnings

Place of birth missing (living people)
21st-century American physicists
American astrophysicists
NASA astrophysicists
Cosmic ray physicists
Living people
Massachusetts Institute of Technology alumni
People from Annapolis, Maryland
People from Fair Haven, New Jersey
University of Maryland, College Park alumni
Rumson-Fair Haven Regional High School alumni
1940 births